In zoology, the principle of homonymy is one of the guiding principles of the International Code of Zoological Nomenclature.

It states that any one name, in one particular spelling, may be used only once (within its group). This will be the first-published name; any later name with the same spelling (a homonym) is barred from being used. The principles of priority and the first reviser apply here. For family-group names the termination (which is rank-bound) is not taken into account.

In 1777 Johann Reinhold Forster published the name Echidna for a genus of moray eels. This meant that when Georges Cuvier proposed to use this name Echidna in 1797 for the spiny anteater he created a junior homonym. Later, in 1811, Johann Karl Wilhelm Illiger published the name Tachyglossus, as a replacement name, or nomen novum, and this is considered to be the valid name for the spiny anteater.

References

Zoological nomenclature